This is a list of cricketers who have played matches for the Pakistan Universities cricket team.

 Mohammad Afzal
 Agha Saadat Ali
 Asif Ahmed
 Ijaz Ahmed
 Imtiaz Ahmed
 Naeem Ahmed
 Saeed Ahmed
 Haseeb Ahsan
 Masood Akhtar
 Ashraf Ali
 Masroor Ali
 Khalid Aziz
 Javed Burki
 Ijaz Butt
 Farooq Azeem
 Fasihuddin
 Aftab Gul
 Aamer Hameed
 Waqar Hasan
 Afaq Hussain
 Mahmood Hussain
 Hasan Jamil
 Azhar Khan
 Ghaffar Khan
 Majid Khan
 Mohsin Khan
 Nadeem Khan
 Amin Lakhani
 Rashid Latif
 Shahid Mahmood
 Asif Masood
 Parvez Mir
 Khan Mohammad
 Nasim-ul-Ghani
 Mudassar Nazar
 Arshad Pervez
 Wasim Raja
 Sultan Rana
 Asad Rauf
 Fazal-ur-Rehman
 Baqar Rizvi
 Salahuddin (cricketer)
 Agha Zahid
 Humayun Zaman
 Ali Zia

References 

Lists of Pakistani cricketers